Nikolai Ivanovych Petrov was an Imperial Russian theologist and philologist, long time worked in the Imperial Russian Southwestern Krai, one of founding members of the National Academy of Sciences of Ukraine.

Petrov who about 40 years worked for the Kiev Theological Academy, in 1918 attended the Ukrainian Science Society Extraordinary General Assembly where an issue was raised about establishing of the Ukrainian Academy of Sciences. Petrov was elected among the first academician of the newly established institution.

Works
 About origin and composition of the Slavic-Russian printing Prologue (1875)
 Outlines out of the history of Ukrainian literature of 19th century (1884)
 Description of manuscript collections located in the city of Kiev. The collection of manuscript of Metropolitan bishop of Moscow Makaria Bulgakov, Meletsky Monastery in Volhynia, Kiev Fraternity Monastery and Kiev Theological Seminary (1892)
 The Kiev Academy in the second half of the 17th century (1895)
 The first (Little Russian) period of his life and scientific and philosophical development of Hryhoriy Savvych Skovoroda (1902)
 Outlines out of the history of Ukrainian literature of 17th and 18th centuries (1911)

References

External links
 Horbyk, V. Nikolai Petrov (ПЕТРОВ МИКОЛА ІВАНОВИЧ). Encyclopedia of History of Ukraine.

1840 births
1921 deaths
People from Kostroma Oblast
People from Makaryevsky Uyezd (Kostroma Governorate)
Full Members of the National Academy of Sciences of Ukraine
Academic staff of the Kiev Theological Academy